The whooper swan (/ˈhuːpə(ɹ) swɒn/) (Cygnus cygnus), also known as the common swan, pronounced hooper swan, is a large northern hemisphere swan. It is the Eurasian counterpart of the North American trumpeter swan, and the type species for the genus Cygnus.

Taxonomy
Francis Willughby and John Ray's Ornithology of 1676 referred to this swan as "the Elk, Hooper, or wild Swan". It was one of the many bird species originally described by Carl Linnaeus in the 1758 10th edition of his Systema Naturae, where it was given the binomial name of Anas cygnus. The species name is from cygnus, the Latin for "swan".

Description

The whooper swan is similar in appearance to Bewick's swan. It is considered to be amongst the heaviest flying birds. It has a more angular head shape and a more variable bill pattern that always shows more yellow than black (Bewick's swans have more black than yellow). Like their close relatives, whooper swans are vocal birds with a call similar to the trumpeter swan.

Distribution and habitat

Whooper swans require large areas of water to live in, especially when they are still growing because their body weight cannot be supported by their legs for extended periods. The whooper swan spends much of its time swimming, straining the water for food, or eating plants that grow on the bottom.

Whooper swans have a deep honking call and, despite their size, are powerful fliers. Whooper swans can migrate hundreds or even thousands of miles to their wintering sites in southern Europe and eastern Asia. They breed in the subarctic Eurosiberia, further south than Bewicks in the taiga zone. They are rare breeders in northern Scotland, particularly in Orkney, and no more than five pairs have bred there in recent years; a handful of pairs have also bred in Ireland in recent years. This bird is an occasional vagrant to the Indian Subcontinent and western North America. Icelandic breeders overwinter in the United Kingdom and Ireland, especially in the wildfowl nature reserves of the Royal Society for the Protection of Birds and the Wildfowl and Wetlands Trust.

Whooper swans pair for life, and their cygnets stay with them all winter; they are sometimes joined by offspring from previous years. Their preferred breeding habitat is wetland, but semi-domesticated birds will build a nest anywhere close to water. Both the male and female help build the nest, and the male will stand guard over the nest while the female incubates. The female will usually lay 4–7 eggs (exceptionally 12). The cygnets hatch after about 36 days and have a grey or brown plumage. The cygnets can fly at an age of 120 to 150 days.

When whooper swans prepare to go on a flight as a flock, they use a variety of signaling movements to communicate with each other. These movements include head bobs, head shakes, and wing flaps and influence whether the flock will take flight and if so, which individual will take the lead. Whooper swans that signaled with these movements in large groups were found to be able to convince their flock to follow them 61% of the time. In comparison, swans that did not signal were only able to create a following 35% of the time. In most cases, the whooper swan in the flock that makes the most movements (head bobs) is also the swan that initiates the flight of the flock – this initiator swan can be either male or female, but is more likely to be a parent than a cygnet. Additionally, this signaling method may be a way for paired mates to stay together in flight. Observational evidence indicates that a swan whose mate is paying attention to and participates in its partner's signals will be more likely to follow through with the flight. Thus, if a whooper swan begins initiating flight signals, it will be less likely to actually carry through with the flight if its mate is not paying attention and is therefore less likely to join it.

They are very noisy; the calls are strident, similar to those of Bewick's swan but more resonant and lower-pitched on average: kloo-kloo-kloo in groups of three or four.

Influence
Whooper swans are much admired in Europe. The whooper swan has been the national bird of Finland since 1981 and is featured on the Finnish 1 euro coin. The whooper swan is one of the species to which the Agreement on the Conservation of African-Eurasian Migratory Waterbirds (AEWA) applies. Musical utterances by whooper swans at the moment of death have been suggested as the origin of the swan song legend. The global spread of H5N1 reached the UK in April 2006 in the form of a dead whooper swan found in Scotland.

References

External links

 Whooper Swan Page RSPB
 
 
 
 
 
 
 

whooper Swan
Whooper Swan
Birds of Eurasia
National symbols of Finland
whooper Swan
Taxa named by Carl Linnaeus